The 1925–26 Sussex County Football League season was the sixth in the history of the competition.

League table
The league featured 12 clubs which competed in the last season, no new clubs joined the league this season.

League table

References

1925-26
9